The TN 60 was a French nuclear missile warhead.

The 1 megaton TN 60 missile warhead entered service in early 1977 as an interim warhead for the MSBS M20 SLBM. The TN 60 was the first French warhead "hardened" to penetrate the Russian ABM defenses around Moscow. The TN 60 was replaced with the TN 61 starting in late 1977.

References
Norris, Robert, Burrows, Andrew, Fieldhouse, Richard "Nuclear Weapons Databook, Volume V, British, French and Chinese Nuclear Weapons, San Francisco, Westview Press, 1994, 

Nuclear bombs of France
Military equipment introduced in the 1970s